Jacchia is a surname. Notable people with the surname include:

 Agide Jacchia (1875–1932), Italian orchestral director
 Alessandro Jacchia (born 1960), Italian television and film producer

See also
 Asteroid 2079 Jacchia, named after astronomer Luigi Jacchia